Paul McKenzie (born 23 January 1984) is an Irish rugby union footballer.  He played centre, wing and full back for Exeter Chiefs as well as Ulster Rugby . He has played for Ireland under 19s, 20s and the Ireland A team.

References

External links
Exeter Chiefs Profile

1984 births
Living people
Irish rugby union players
Ulster Rugby players
Exeter Chiefs players
People educated at Bangor Grammar School
Ireland Wolfhounds international rugby union players
Rugby union centres